The Reverend Frank Hilton Jackson (16 August 1870, Hull, England – 27 April 1960) was an English clergyman and mathematician who worked on basic hypergeometric series. He introduced several q-analogs such as the 
Jackson–Bessel functions, the Jackson-Hahn-Cigler q-addition, the  Jackson derivative, and the  Jackson integral.

Further reading
Ernst, T. (2012). A Comprehensive Treatment of q-Calculus. Springer Science & Business Media.
Gasper, G., Rahman, M.(2004). Basic Hypergeometric Series. Cambridge University Press.

References

Selected papers
 Jackson, F. H. (1917). The -integral analogous to Borel's integral. Messenger Math, 47, 57–64.
 Jackson, F. H. (1921). Summation of -hypergeometric series. Messenger of Math, 57, 101–112.
 Jackson, F. H. (1928). Examples of a generalization of Euler's transformation for power series. Messenger Math, 57, 169–187.
 Jackson, F. H. (1940). The  equations whose solutions are products of solutions of  equations of lower order. The Quarterly Journal of Mathematics, (1), 1-17.
 Jackson, F. H. (1941). Certain -identities. The Quarterly Journal of Mathematics, (1), 167–172.
 Jackson, F. H. (1942). On basic double hypergeometric functions. The Quarterly Journal of Mathematics, (1), 69–82.
 Jackson, F. H. (1944). Basic double hypergeometric functions (II). The Quarterly Journal of Mathematics, (1), 49–61.

1870 births
1960 deaths
English mathematicians
Q-analogs
Special functions